Andrea Abreu (born 1995) is a Spanish writer. She was born in Tenerife. She published the poetry collection Mujer sin párpados in 2017, and the fanzine Primavera que sangra in 2020. Also in 2020, her debut novel Panza de burro was published by Sabina Urraca. The book was a massive hit and has been optioned for translations in various languages, including in English by Weidenfeld & Nicolson.

In 2021, she was named by Granta magazine as one of the best young writers in the Spanish language.

References

Spanish writers
1995 births
Living people